Muhammad Hussein Memar also known as Hussein Memar was born and raised in Tehran, Iran. His cousin Mahmoud Memar also was a famous national football player of Iran. He started playing football in 1988 and joined Vahdat football club as a young player. His coach at the time was Majid Jalali. He played for Fath football club then. Fath was a very famous club and had players like Khodadad Azizi, Behrouz Rahbari Fard, Yadollah Akbari, etc. Hussein Memar played for the famous Iranian coaches Homayoun Shahrokhi and Hussein Faraki in Fath. He was transferred to Bahman in 1997 and played in Azadegan League under the coaching of Farhad Kazemi with Hamid Estilli, Asghar Modir Rousta, Khodadad Azizi, Muhammad Khakpour, etc. 

In 2000 he was transferred to Emirate Football League to Alzeyd Sharje and played for Homayoun Shahrokhi again. He played for Paykan for seven years with Hamid Alidousti, Bijan Zolfaghar Nasab and Hamid Derakhshan. He played for Damash Gilan and Nirooye Zamini before he retired as a player.

He went on to study and attend coaching classes and got his AFC A, B, C and D degrees in coaching. He has worked with Mehdi Tartar as assisting coach in Pasr Jonoubi, Naft Masjed Soleyman, Paykan and Now he is working in Zob Ahan.

AFC Coaching Certificates 
Hussein Memar has achieved:

- AFC "A"  Coaching license Certificate

- AFC "B"  Coaching license Certificate

- AFC "C"  Coaching license Certificate

- AFC "D"  Coaching license Certificate

Club career

Club career statistics

Coaching Experiences

References
Iran Pro League Stats

https://www.varzesh3.com/football/player/352/%D8%AD%D8%B3%DB%8C%D9%86-%D9%85%D8%B9%D9%85%D8%A7%D8%B1

http://dsport.ir/fa/news/68548/%D8%AD%D8%B3%DB%8C%D9%86-%D9%85%D8%B9%D9%85%D8%A7%D8%B1-%D8%AF%D8%B1-%D9%BE%D8%A7%D8%B1%D8%B3-%D8%AC%D9%86%D9%88%D8%A8%DB%8C-%D8%AC%D9%85-%D8%B9%DA%A9%D8%B3

Iranian footballers
Paykan F.C. players
Saipa F.C. players
Persian Gulf Pro League players
1972 births
Living people
Association football defenders